Waterside is a Canadian community just outside Alma, New Brunswick on The Bay of Fundy.
It has a population of almost 100, with summer cottages along the shore. It is near Cape Enrage, a popular tourist destination and a lighthouse.

History

Notable people

See also
List of communities in New Brunswick

References

Communities in Albert County, New Brunswick